North Boston is a hamlet and census-designated place (CDP) in the town of Boston in Erie County, New York, United States. As of the 2010 census, the CDP population was 2,521. It is part of the Buffalo–Niagara Falls Metropolitan Statistical Area.

North Boston is on the northern town line, located around the junction of NY Routes 277 and 391.

Geography
North Boston is located at  (42.681935, -78.784065).

Demographics

At the 2000 census there were 2,680 people, 1,049 households, and 766 families living in the CDP. The population density was 652.9 per square mile (252.4/km). There were 1,080 housing units at an average density of 263.1/sq mi (101.7/km).  The racial makeup of the CDP was 99.10% White, 0.07% African American, 0.19% Native American, 0.04% Asian, 0.04% Pacific Islander, 0.26% from other races, and 0.30% from two or more races. Hispanic or Latino of any race were 0.90%.

Of the 1,049 households 31.6% had children under the age of 18 living with them, 62.1% were married couples living together, 8.3% had a female householder with no husband present, and 26.9% were non-families. 23.0% of households were one person and 9.4% were one person aged 65 or older. The average household size was 2.55 and the average family size was 3.02.

The age distribution was 24.0% under the age of 18, 6.3% from 18 to 24, 29.3% from 25 to 44, 26.3% from 45 to 64, and 14.1% 65 or older. The median age was 40 years. For every 100 females, there were 100.0 males. For every 100 females age 18 and over, there were 95.5 males.

The median household income was $45,898 and the median family income  was $57,266. Males had a median income of $35,833 versus $29,479 for females. The per capita income for the CDP was $22,089. About 1.0% of families and 1.8% of the population were below the poverty line, including 2.2% of those under age 18 and 4.2% of those age 65 or over.

References

Hamlets in New York (state)
Census-designated places in New York (state)
Buffalo–Niagara Falls metropolitan area
Census-designated places in Erie County, New York
Hamlets in Erie County, New York